Enga Thambi is a 1993 Indian Tamil-language romantic action film directed  by Sabapathy Dekshinamurthy. The film stars Prashanth and Subhashri, with Lakshmi, Nagesh and Nassar in supporting roles. It was released on 9 April 1993.

Plot 

Pichumani is an orphan, and Muthu brings him up. Pichumani falls in love with Indu, but her uncle Dinakar, a police officer, opposes this. Nevertheless, Indu is determined to wed her first love. To avert this, Dinakar hatches a plan through which Pichumani is imprisoned. When Indu gives up hope, advocate Shanthi emerges to fight his case. It is revealed that Shanthi and Dinakar have been in a relationship earlier. In the end, Dinakar is arrested and discovers that Pichumani is his son and that Shanthi is his mother. The film ends with Pichumani and Indu getting married.

Cast 

 Prashanth as Pichumani
 Subhashri as Indu
 Lakshmi as Shanthi
 Nagesh as Muthu
 Nassar as Dinakar
 Chinni Jayanth as Double Seven
 Thyagu as K.K
 Madhan Bob as Sharma
 Kullamani
 V. S. Raghavan
 Rocky Rajesh in a special appearance as Rocky Rajesh
 Raju Sundaram in a special appearance

Production 
Subhashri, sister of Kannada actress Malasri, was recommended by Thiagarajan to be the heroine of the film. He had also recommended the actress to be a part of Shankar's Gentleman, while the director had met with Prashanth and his father Thiagarajan, while considering the casting for Kadhalan.

Soundtrack 
The music of the film was composed by Ilaiyaraaja and released by actor Rajinikanth at a launch event. The lyrics were written by Vaali, Pulamaipithan, Muthulingam and Ponnadiyan.

Reception 
K. Vijiyan from New Straits Times noted that the film "makes best of a weak story", praising the performances of Prashanth and Nassar. Malini Mannath of The Indian Express wrote, "S. D. Saba [..] handles the script and his artists with confidence and his narration is fairly neat." C. R. K. of Kalki praised the director, cinematographer and cast.

References

External links 
 

1990s romantic action films
1990s Tamil-language films
1993 films
Films directed by Sabapathy Dekshinamurthy
Films scored by Ilaiyaraaja
Indian romantic action films